Burton Merrele Richardson (born September 29, 1949, in Portland, Oregon) is an American television announcer.

Career
He announced The Arsenio Hall Show from 1989 to 1994, where he became known for his long-drawn-out introduction of the show's host: "ARSENIOOOOOOO... HALL!". Richardson has also announced various game shows, including Rodeo Drive, Russian Roulette, WinTuition, To Tell the Truth (1990 and 2000), Family Feud (from 1999 until 2010, as well as Celebrity Family Feud), and The New Price Is Right in 1994–1995. From 2001, he was one of several announcers who filled in on The Price Is Right for Rod Roddy during his terminal illness period. He was the announcer for Family Game Night on The Hub from 2010 to 2012.

References

External links
 

1949 births
Living people
Game show announcers
Television personalities from Portland, Oregon